"Ring the Alarm" is a song recorded by American singer Beyoncé for her second studio album, B'Day (2006). It was written by Knowles, Kasseem "Swizz Beatz" Dean, and Sean Garrett. Columbia Records released "Ring the Alarm" as the second single from B'Day in the United States on October 17, 2006, while "Irreplaceable" (2006) was serviced as the album's second international and third US single. The song's development was motivated by Knowles' role in the Broadway musical adaptation Dreamgirls (2006). The cover art of "Ring the Alarm" proved controversial because Knowles used alligators during the photography session. PETA declared that Knowles' posing with a baby alligator was arguably abusive to an animal.

"Ring the Alarm" is an R&B song. Its introduction features a blaring siren, which sets an aggressive tone. The song's lyrics involve a woman who feels threatened, and is unwilling to allow another woman to profit from the protagonist's efforts to improve her lover's life. The lyrics were rumored to be about Barbadian recording artist Rihanna's relationship with Jay-Z; Knowles refuted the allegation in an interview with Seventeen magazine. The song was received with mixed reception for contemporary music critics, who noted that it was different from Knowles' previous work. While some commended her willingness to take risks, others were polarized about her aggressive vocals. "Ring the Alarm" was nominated for Best Female R&B Vocal Performance at the 49th Annual Grammy Awards.

The single debuted at number 12 on the US Billboard Hot 100 chart, becoming Knowles' highest US debut at the time. It reached number 11 on the chart, becoming her first solo single to peak below the top 10. Its accompanying music video was inspired by the 1992 film Basic Instinct and was directed by Sophie Muller. It was filmed inside a cavernous hangar on the Brooklyn waterfront in New York City. The video garnered generally mixed reviews critics, who universally thought that it was eccentric. Knowles promoted "Ring the Alarm" through various live performances on televised shows and awards ceremonies, including the 2006 MTV Video Music Awards. The song was included on her set list on the Beyoncé Experience (2007) in Los Angeles, her world tour I Am... World Tour. (2009–10), her On the Run Tour (2014) with Jay-Z, the Formation World Tour (2016), and her OTR II (2018) with Jay-Z again.

Background and development
After six months of filming for the Broadway musical adaptation of Dreamgirls, Knowles was on vacation. Inspired by her role in the film, she said: "[When filming ended,] I had so many things bottled up, so many emotions, so many ideas". After contacting American songwriters and record producers Sean Garrett along with Rodney Jerkins, Rich Harrison, and Kasseem "Swizz Beatz" Dean, Knowles rented Sony Music Studios to begin working on her second solo album B'Day. Garret said: "I came to the studio and saw the zone...everybody in here is banging out. Rodney Jerkins had his session, Rich Harrison had his session going on...I started banging out some shit." "Ring the Alarm" was produced by Knowles, Garrett and Swizz Beatz; its lyrics were being written at the same time by the trio. Swizz Beatz stated: "['Ring the Alarm' is] just one of the many presents I gave [Knowles] for her B'Day. I have the most tracks on her album as a single producer". "Ring the Alarm" was co-arranged by Knowles and recorded in the same studio. She said about her collaboration with Swizz Beatz, "I love working with Swizz. He's challenging. His beats are so complex it's hard to find a melody. But ['Ring the Alarm'] just clicked".

Composition
According to the sheet music published by EMI Music Publishing, it is composed in the key of A minor but changes to E major in the bridge and changes to A minor, and set in common time at a moderately slow tempo of 85 beats per minute. The instrumentation of "Ring the Alarm" includes drums, clattering percussion instrument, treble synthesizers, and bass instrument. It also makes use of a slapping backbeat, an air horn, titanic handclaps, plonks, and breathing noises. A blaring siren is used as the song's introductory sound, setting an aggressive tone, which is augmented by Knowles' throaty mezzo-soprano growl. Tim Finney of Pitchfork described her vocals as "thrillingly sharp with anxiety and paranoia", and Tom Breihan of The Village Voice commented that she sings with "a frantic intensity". Knowles' vocals range from the note of A3 to F5. Her strong shout vocal styling is meshed with the grooves, and enhanced with echo and shimmer, which overlap with one another, creating a neo-warm vibe.

Knowles commented on the song, "It's energetic, aggressive and filled with hard beats". She explained that the album was completed in three weeks, which is the reason most of the record, including "Ring the Alarm" sounds aggressive. She further clarified that she did not intend to write an angry song, "Swizz's ['Ring the Alarm'] had that tough vibe, like the guy had cheated, and I wanted to write something honest. If you're in a relationship, even if the man's cheating and you end up not wanting him, the thought of another woman benefiting from the lessons you taught him." "Ring the Alarm" features Knowles as the female protagonist impersonating a threatened woman involved in a love triangle. She is unwilling to allow another woman to profit from all the efforts she put on to make her lover a better man. Frances Romero of Time magazine noted that Knowles' anger is due to her man's wandering eye, her desire to leave, and the thought of having to give him up to some unworthy woman.

Tamara Coniff of Billboard magazine noted that the verses of "Ring the Alarm" resemble those of Aretha Franklin's songs. Tom Breihan commented that Knowles "[wails] with force and purpose on the verses". As the song opens, she tells her lover, "I can't let you go", and that she will not allow another woman to take everything she owns, including the chinchilla coats and the house on the coast. Knowles screams the refrain—"Ring the alarm, I've been doin[g] this too long / But I'll be damned if I see another chick on your arm"—"through a thick fog of distortion", as noted by Jody Rosen of Entertainment Weekly. Sarah Rodman of The Boston Globe added that she chants the lines with grit and urgency, while Breihan wrote that she sings them "with a frantic intensity". Knowles later declares that her relationship is "not the picture perfect movie everyone would assume".

Release

In June 2006, Knowles invited Tamara Coniff of Billboard to a New York recording studio where she played "Ring the Alarm" and "Freakum Dress" (2006) for the prospect of the next US single, and she also had plans for "Green Light" (2007) and "Get Me Bodied" (2007) to hit international markets. However, she ultimately opted for "Ring the Alarm" to be released as the second single of the album in the United States, following "Déjà Vu" (2006). On September 10, 2006, it was added to US urban contemporary radio playlists. A two-track CD single was released on October 3, 2006, and a five-track remix CD was later made available on October 17, 2006. Knowles approached English production team Freemasons to remix "Ring the Alarm". A club-oriented remix was produced and included on the band's debut studio album Shakedown (2007).

Controversies
The lyrics of "Ring the Alarm" were rumored to be about singer Rihanna's relationship with rapper Jay-Z. According to media speculation, Knowles, Rihanna and Jay-Z were part of a love triangle in 2006. It was rumored that Jay-Z had always been faithful to Knowles until he met Rihanna, whose popularity grew considerably during that year. She tempted Jay-Z to live a romantic relationship with her while he was still with Knowles. As commented by Tom Breihan of The Village Voice, Knowles took advantage of "[people's] sympathy and unleash[ed] a burst of public rage in the form of ['Ring the Alarm']". In an interview for Seventeen magazine, she however clarified that the lyrics had no connection with Rihanna, before adding that she was unaware of the rumors that had been circulating. Concerned that someone was trying to sabotage Knowles' second studio album, Knowles' father and manager, Mathew Knowles, released an official statement:

It is apparent that there is a consistent plan by some to create chaos around Beyoncé's B'Day album release on September 4 in the US. First, it was a petition against the single, 'Déjà Vu', then a rumor regarding conflict between Beyoncé and Rihanna, seizures caused by the 'Ring the Alarm' video, putting out a single to compete with LeToya's album and now to add to all the ridiculous rumors, is my plan to postpone the release of her 'B'Day' album. What will be next? Beyoncé's cut off all her hair? Dyed it green? Maybe she's singing the songs in reverse with some hidden subliminal message!

The cover art of "Ring the Alarm", caused controversy because alligators were used during the photography session. Knowles affirmed that using the animal, and taping their mouths shut, was her idea. People for the Ethical Treatment of Animals (PETA), which had previously confronted her after she used furs for her fashion line's clothing design, contacted a biologist who wrote a letter to Knowles, "As a specialist in reptile biology and welfare, I'm concerned about your posing with a terrified baby alligator for your new album cover. Humans and alligators are not natural bedfellows, and the two should not mix at events such as photo shoots. In my view, doing so is arguably abusive to an animal."

Critical reception
"Ring the Alarm" received polarized responses from contemporary music critics, who noted that it was a marked departure from Knowles' previous material. Eb Haynes of AllHipHop wrote that the song is "emotionally high-powered. The Boston Globe Sarah Rodman noted that it finds Knowles in "full hell-hath-no-fury mode", singing with grit and urgency that feel genuine. A critic of Billboard magazine viewed "Ring the Alarm" as a memorable release even though he wrote that it is not as good as Knowles' 2003 single "Crazy in Love". He praised her distorted vocals and the "ranting assault of a lyric", which she uses to convince her love interest. Jody Rosen of Entertainment Weekly called "Ring the Alarm" torrid, and wrote that Knowles "sounds positively horrified by the prospect of relinquishing the luxury goodies her boyfriend has bought her". Brian Hiatt of Rolling Stone stated that she sings with "enough frantic, quavering intensity to make you believe she really is crazy in love". Marcos Chin of Vibe magazine described "Ring the Alarm" as "both a sexual invitation and a threat". Darryl Sterdan of Jam! described "Ring the Alarm" as a "shrill tantrum of green-eyed monsterdom", and Kelefa Sanneh of The New York Times described it as a "canny display of emotional vulnerability". Tom Breihan of The Village Voice commented that "Ring the Alarm" may become Knowles' "You Oughta Know".

Spence D. of IGN Music commented that the best examples of Knowles vocal stylings come on "Ring The Alarm", adding that it is one of the few tracks on the album where she goes for a throaty growl. Sal Cinquemani of Slant Magazine wrote that it was a bold choice for a single Dave de Sylvi of Sputnikmusic noted that "Ring the Alarm" was a brave choice for a single, called it "angry and lyrically incendiary", and noted that Swizz Beatz's beats are "unusually intricate". Norman Meyers of Prefix Magazine noted that the song is evidence of Knowles' willingness to take chances. Calling "Ring the Alarm" a "bunny-boiling bonanza" and a "killer club track", Rach Read of TeenToday wrote that it is a definite highlight and that "it's great to see an artist at the top of her game prepared to take risks with a track as unhinged as this." Chris Richards of The Washington Post defined Knowles' character in the song as a "jealousy-crazed ex", and expressed his disappointment that it could not manage a "more convincing refrain". Andy Kellman of Allmusic called it "an angered, atonal, and out-of-character song". Tim Finney of Pitchfork Media wrote, "the siren-assisted caterwaul of second single 'Ring the Alarm' sounds genuinely (and marvelously) incoherent." Bernard Zuel of The Sydney Morning Herald described "Ring the Alarm" as a "posturing and eventually annoying" track.

Accolades
Vibe ranked "Ring the Alarm" at number forty-eight on its list of the Top 60 Songs of 2006, complimenting the vocal distortion and the way Knowles shouts on the chorus and the hook. Frances Romero of Time listed "Ring the Alarm" at number nine on her list of the Top 10 Angry Breakup Songs of the 2000s decade, writing: "Critics had mixed feelings about the song ... In the end, what it does show is that Beyoncé will have her way." Staff members of Pitchfork ranked the song on their list of The Top 100 Tracks of 2006 at number eighty-five. The song was nominated for Best Female R&B Vocal Performance at the 49th Annual Grammy Awards (2007) but lost to Mary J. Blige's song "Be Without You" (2005). Jody Rosen from The New Yorker credited  the jarring timbral and tonal variations on the song for giving a new musical sound that didn't exist in the world before Knowles. He further wrote, "If they sound 'normal' now, it's because Beyoncé, and her many followers, have retrained our ears." On their ranking of the best singles of aughts, Slant Magazine included "Ring the Alarm" at number two-hundred-and-twenty-six.

Commercial performance
For the week ending September 23, 2006, "Ring the Alarm" debuted at number twelve on the US Billboard Hot 100, following its entry at number seven on the US Hot Digital Songs, selling around 56,000 digital downloads. It was the highest debut that week in the United States, and was the highest debuting song of Knowles' career until "Formation" and "Sorry" debuted at numbers ten and eleven, respectively, in May 2016. The song peaked at number eleven on the Hot 100 chart issue dated September 30, 2006, and was Knowles' lowest peaking single until "Get Me Bodied", which peaked at number sixty-eight. Several weeks after leaving the Hot 100 chart, "Ring the Alarm" re-entered it for the week ending January 13, 2007, at number eighty-one; it remained on the chart for fourteen non-consecutive weeks.

"Ring the Alarm" was more successful on the US Billboard component charts. It topped the Dance Club Songs, Hot R&B/Hip-Hop Singles Sales and Hot 100 Singles Sales chart, and reached number three on the Hot R&B/Hip-Hop Songs. The song additionally charted at number twenty-one on the US Rhythmic and at number nineteen on the US Pop 100. Though not released outside the United States, "Ring the Alarm" charted at number fifty-six on January 15, 2007, in Sweden.

Music video
The music video for "Ring the Alarm" was the second video of Knowles' to be directed by Sophie Muller, who worked on "Déjà Vu". The video was filmed inside a cavernous hangar located on the waterfront in Brooklyn, New York City. It remakes a scene from the film Basic Instinct (1992), referred to by Natalie More of In These Times as an infamous scene. Knowles wears a white skirt and turtleneck to emulate Sharon Stone. She told Elysa Gardner of USA Today that she considered the video to be a movie scene; "I put six months aside, worked with a coach for two months. And that carried through to my music. I treated the video for 'Ring the Alarm' like a movie scene. I was thinking, 'I've got to make my acting coach proud." The video premiered at Yahoo! Music on August 16, 2006 and was released to US iTunes Store on November 21, 2006. It debuted on MTV's Total Request Live at number ten on August 22, 2006, reached number one, and remained on the show for 35 days until it was replaced by the music video for "Irreplaceable" (2006). The video credited then-16-year-old dancer Teyana Taylor as the choreographer.

The video starts with Knowles laying on a table, lit with a flashing bright red light. While a siren is blaring, she half-stands and sings while dancing on the table. She proceeds to an interrogation room similar to the one in the film Basic Instinct. Knowles sings the first verse in a house with a seashore backdrop. She wants to escape, and struggles with masked and uniformed guards in a hallway. She is then returned to the interrogation room. In between cuts, she sings in a corner of a room, is seen reflected in a mirror while screaming, and among a group of reporters. As the song closes, Knowles is shown crying. The video ends with a close-up view of Knowles putting on red lipstick. The scene shows only her lips.

The music video gained mostly mixed reviews from critics. Andy Kellman of AllMusic wrote that it "invited all kinds of perplexed analysis". Jose Antonio Vargas of The Washington Post described Knowles' persona as a "ranting, angry woman". Elizabeth Goodman of Rolling Stone speculated that the use of guards in riot gear is a reference to Alias. Tom Breihan of The Village Voice described the clip as a "quick-and-dirty" video and a "fast montage of disconnected and disconnecting images". Blogger Roger Friedman of Fox News called it a "bizarre video depicting a wildly angry and unappealing Beyoncé telling off someone (maybe Jay-Z?) for cheating as if she were an enraged guest on Maury Povich." The staff members of Pitchfork Media included the music video at number twenty-one on the list of Top 25 Music Videos of 2006. Ryan Dombal further wrote that it was "Almost as good as Basic Instinct 2: Risk Addiction". In 2013, John Boone and Jennifer Cady of E! Online placed the video at number six on their list of Knowles' ten best music videos.

Live performances

Knowles performed "Ring the Alarm" at the 2006 MTV Video Music Awards on August 31, 2006, wearing a flowing trench coat, a corset and hotpants. The performance referenced Janet Jackson's "Rhythm Nation" routine. James Montgomery of MTV News commented that as Knowles sang, she "...stripped and stalked." Jocelyn Vena of the same publication, wrote that she had a "frantic performance" of the song along with a "fiercely choreographed breakdown" at the end. Erika Ramirez of Billboard magazine put the performance at number five on her list of "Beyonce's 5 Biggest TV Performances" saying that Knowles "kill[ed]" the live performance. She later performed the song on the American morning news and talk show, Good Morning America. "Ring the Alarm" was included on Knowles' set list for her The Beyoncé Experience concert in Los Angeles, and I Am... World Tour venues.

During a performance of "Ring the Alarm" in Orlando, Florida on July 26, 2007, Knowles fell down a flight of stairs on stage and was videoed by several fans. She told her audience that it "hurt so bad" and requested, "Don't put [the footage] on YouTube." However, the next morning, several clips of Knowles' fall were available on YouTube, and reported in the media. The videos were quickly removed from YouTube because users had transgressed the website's terms of use." A representative from YouTube said that users posting their footage of the incident were guilty of infringement because "even if [they] took the video [themselves], the performer controls the right to use his/her image in a video, the songwriter owns the rights to the song being performed and sometimes the venue prohibits filming without permission." After being removed, clips of Knowles' fall were later reposted on YouTube and other video-sharing sites like eBaum's World and Dailymotion. Jay-Z later stated on radio that even though Knowles is "...a great performer who's on point 99 percent of the time, she's still human."

Knowles performed "Ring the Alarm" on August 5, 2007, at Madison Square Garden in Manhattan, wearing a long red overcoat. Jon Pareles of The New York Times praised her performance, stating: "Beyoncé needs no distractions from her singing, which can be airy or brassy, tearful or vicious, rapid-fire with staccato syllables or sustained in curlicued melismas. But she was in constant motion, strutting in costumes." In Los Angeles, Knowles performed song, dressed in a long red overcoat. She was accompanied by several backup dancers and live instrumentation. When she sang "Ring the Alarm" in Sunrise, Florida on June 29, 2009, Knowles was wearing a glittery gold leotard. Animated graphics of turntables, faders and other club equipment were projected behind her, the dancers and the musicians. Knowles was accompanied by two drummers, two keyboardists, a percussionist, a horn section, three backup vocalists and a lead guitarist. "Ring the Alarm" was included on her 2007 live album The Beyoncé Experience Live.

Formats and track listings

US CD single and 12-inch vinyl
 "Ring the Alarm" – 3:26
 "Ring the Alarm" (instrumental) – 3:25

US remix CD single
 "Ring the Alarm" (Karmatronic Remix) – 3:21
 "Ring the Alarm" (Migtight Remix) – 3:21
 "Ring the Alarm" (Tranzformas Remix) – 4:14
 "Ring the Alarm" (Jazze Pha Remix) – 3:48
 "Ring the Alarm" (Grizz Remix) – 3:32

US Dance Mixes EP

 "Ring the Alarm" (Freemasons Club Mix) – 8:33
 "Ring the Alarm" (Karmatronic Remix) – 3:19
 "Ring the Alarm" (Migtight Remix) – 3:19

US Urban Mixes EP

 "Ring the Alarm" (Tranzformas Remix) (feat. Collie Buddz) – 4:12
 "Ring the Alarm" (Jazze Pha Remix) – 3:47
 "Ring the Alarm" (Grizz Remix) – 3:32

Spanglish Mix

 "Ring the Alarm" (Spanglish Mix) - 3:24

Credits and personnel
 Beyoncé Knowles – vocals, production, writing, executive production
 Mathew Knowles – executive production, management, A&R
 Jim Caruana – recording
 Rob Kinelski – recording assistance
 Jason Goldstein – mixing
 Swizz Beatz – mixing, production, writing
 Sean Garrett – production, writing
 Steve Tolle – mixing assistance
 Brian Gardner – mastering
 Max Gousse – A&R

Charts

Weekly charts

Year-end charts

Decade-end charts

Certifications

Release history

See also
 List of number-one dance singles of 2006 (U.S.)

In popular culture
 "Ring the Alarm" has featured in the third series premiere of popular UK teen drama Skins.
 Haven Holidays had sampled the main instrumental part of the Freemason's Club Mix of "Ring the Alarm" for their Funstars Go! Live background music whenever the Funstars play silly or funny games within a time limit.

References

2006 singles
2006 songs
Beyoncé songs
Columbia Records singles
Music videos directed by Sophie Muller
Song recordings produced by Beyoncé
Song recordings produced by Swizz Beatz
Songs written by Beyoncé
Songs written by Sean Garrett
Songs written by Swizz Beatz